Deer Lick is an unincorporated community and census-designated place (CDP) in Delaware County, Oklahoma, United States. The population was 46 at the 2010 census.

Geography

Demographics

References

Census-designated places in Delaware County, Oklahoma
Census-designated places in Oklahoma